CSI: Miami is a video game based on the CSI: Miami television series. The game was developed by Radical Entertainment (under the 369 Interactive label), published by Ubisoft, and was released for the Microsoft Windows on April 24, 2004.  In 2008, Gameloft redeveloped the game for iOS.

This game, like CSI: Crime Scene Investigation, follows a distinct pattern of five cases, with the fifth case tying together the previous four.

The Cases

PC version

Case 1 – Later, Gator
A severed arm, belonging to a man named Tim Cole, has been found on the Palm Glen golf course next to the corpse of an alligator. The evidence is pointing towards murder – but the victim had a very complicated life and several people with motives. In this case, you work with Calleigh Duquesne. Persons of interest are Heather Cole, the victim's wife who was fed up with his philandering, Russell Cole, his absent son, Ty Landon, a notable golf club member, Ronni Landon, Ty's wife who was sleeping with both Tim and Russ, Tammy Landon, Ty and Ronni's daughter and Russ's classmate, and Judge Lawford. Russ is the first suspect as he vanished just before his father's arm was found and his alibi turns out to be false, but it turns out he was at a college party and got arrested for intoxication. Further evidence implicates Ronni as the killer – the murder weapon (a golf club) was found in her golf bag and a chainsaw with Tim's blood on it in the garage – but the case is solved when a scorecard found at Tim's house indicated he was there two days before he died, contradicting Heather's story that she kicked him out a week earlier. Heather finally decided Tim was never going to change his ways, so she killed him, cut up his body, and dumped it at sea. When the alligator got hold of one of Tim's arms, Heather planted evidence in the Landon house to make it seem that Ronni had killed Tim out of jealousy.

Case 2 – Crack or Jack
In a nightclub investigated by the FBI, the owner, Jack Wilson, is found dead in the middle of the dance floor, struck with a lamp in the head. What first looks like an accident turns out to be a homicide. In this case, you work with Tim Speedle. Persons of interest are Enrique, the nightclub's Hispanic bouncer who was embezzling from Jack, Nicky Winters, a waitress working in a bar across town, and Ron Preston, the former business partner of the victim. You also meet star lawyer Donny Bronson for the first time. It is eventually revealed that Jack paid Enrique and Nicky to frame Ron for drug trafficking, as Ron was causing Jack to lose business. However, Nicky wound up revealing the plan to Ron out of guilt, and Ron killed Jack by accident during the ensuing confrontation. Ron then panicked and frantically staged the scene to look like the accident happened on its own.

Case 3 – The Hate Boat
A woman is found dead in a mysterious boat with strangulation marks and a gunshot wound to the head. In this case you work with Eric Delko. Persons of interest are a star singer who called 911, her BDSM-loving husband, and a psychiatrist, who is an old acquaintance of the team.

Case 4 – Sunstroke
A wealthy but bad-mannered man, Roy Diamond, is found dead sitting in a chair on the beach outside of his house, next to him the corpse of his pet dog. There are no visual signs of murder but the death of two beings at once is too much of a coincidence to rule out the possibility of murder, especially after it comes to light that Diamond's son also died a suspicious death. In this case you work with Yelina Salas. Persons of interest are the house cook, the victim's other son, who was illegitimate, Denise Diamond, the wife of the deceased son and prime suspect in his death, and Donny Bronson. It is revealed that the son was not murdered, but that Denise killed her father-in-law because of his advances toward her.

Case 5 – Final Judgement
Judge Lawford is found dead in his study with a gunshot wound to the head. Suspects from all other cases are included in this one, and as such this is the case which ties all the other cases together. In this case you work with Horatio Caine, but when interviewing suspects, you work with each of the other CSI's, depending upon which suspect you interview. Persons of interest are all the murderers from the previous four cases (Heather Cole, Ron Preston, the psychiatrist, and Denise Diamond), a journalist who worked with Lawford on his autobiography and claims to be abducted by one of the perps, Ty Landon and Donny Bronson.

iOS Case
In the iOS version there is only one case, a woman's body is found washed up on South Beach with a gunshot wound in her shoulder and fluid in her lungs. In this case you work as Horatio Caine.
We know her name is Madison Healey, the water in her lungs is chlorinated, and the gun isn't the murder weapon. Alexx's autopsy report said the COD is drowning and the TOD is about 9-10AM that morning and South Beach isn't the primary crime scene. Our first suspect is Joshua Martin, which was found dead at the same beach. Our second suspect is Ema Rodriguez, which she admitted that she killed the vic because of jealousy. Our last suspect is Diego Sanchez, which we found that his yacht was the primary crime scene to kill Madison and he admitted that he killed Joshua to keep him quiet about something.

Reception

The game was met with mixed reception, as GameRankings gave the PC version a score of 57.89%, while Metacritic gave it 54 out of 100.

References

Notes

Citations

External links
 CSI: Miami App Store profile
 CSI: Miami Game Help and Chat at CSIGAMER.com
 

2004 video games
Adventure games
CSI (franchise) video games
CSI: Miami
First-person adventure games
Gameloft games
IOS games
Mobile games
Radical Entertainment games
Ubisoft games
Video games about police officers
Video games developed in Canada
Video games set in Miami
Windows games